The 1931–32 season saw Newport County return to the Southern League following their failure to be re-elected to the Football League. However, after this one season hiatus they were re-elected for the 1932–33 season.

Season review

Results summary 
Note: Two points for a win

Fixtures and results

Southern League Western Division

Welsh Cup

League table

Election

External links
 Newport County Archives
 Welsh Cup 1931/32

References

 Amber in the Blood: A History of Newport County. 

1931-32
English football clubs 1931–32 season